Goodland is a populated place in the parish of Saint Michael, Barbados.

See also
 List of cities, towns and villages in Barbados

References

Saint Michael, Barbados
Populated places in Barbados